Upsilon Virginis (υ Vir, υ Virginis) is a single star in the zodiac constellation of Virgo. It has an apparent visual magnitude of 5.25, making it faintly visible to the naked eye. According to the Bortle scale, it is visible from backlit suburban skies at night.

This star has a stellar classification of G9 III, which indicates it is an evolved G-type giant star. It has an estimated 172% of the Sun's mass and has expanded to 12 times the radius of the Sun, from which it is shining with 64.6 times the solar luminosity. The effective temperature of the star's outer atmosphere is 4,753 K. Based upon its motion through space, there is a 66% chance of being a member of the Hercules stream and a 27% chance it is a thin disk star.

References

G-type giants
Virgo (constellation)
Virginis, Upsilon
Virginis, 102
125454
070012
5366
Durchmusterung objects